The Zuidas (literally South Axis in Dutch) is a rapidly developing business district in the city of Amsterdam in the Netherlands. The Zuidas is also known as the 'Financial Mile'. It lies between the rivers Amstel and Schinkel along the ringway A10. The greatest influences for the development of the Zuidas are La Défense in Paris and Canary Wharf in London. In size it can best be compared with the Noordruimte/Espace Nord in Brussels.

In the future, the local Amsterdam Zuid railway station is planned to become the second main station in Amsterdam. It is expected to become the fifth busiest passenger station in the Netherlands, with connections to Schiphol Airport, Rotterdam, Antwerp, Brussels, and Paris via the Thalys, a high-speed rail. It will also connect to the German high-speed network, the ICE, via Utrecht and Arnhem.

The journey from the Zuidas to Amsterdam Airport Schiphol takes approximately 8 minutes. Future development could include an underground line directly to the airport. Another high-speed link has been proposed by a consortium of companies between Amsterdam Airport Schiphol, Amsterdam Zuid and the city of Almere.

The Zuidas already has good underground connections to other business areas with the Circle Line. With the completion of the North South line, the Zuidas has an even better connection to the city center. The city council is not only investigating expanding the underground network to Amsterdam Airport Schiphol but also upgrading the hybrid metro/light rail line that stops at Amsterdam Zuid.

Large multinationals such as ABN-Amro and Akzo Nobel have their headquarters in this new area. Between 1998 and 2004, the World Trade Center Amsterdam was renovated and expanded.

The main infrastructural axis (Ring-A10) is scheduled to be tunnelled, transforming the entire area. This would add an estimated €2 billion to the cost of the plan.

See also
Law firms of the Netherlands

References

External links 

 Zuidas, website of the city of Amsterdam

Amsterdam-Zuid
Central business districts
Economy of Amsterdam
Neighbourhoods of Amsterdam